The 1989 Tiananmen Square protests and massacre were the first of their type shown in detail on Western television. The Chinese government's response was denounced, particularly by Western governments and media. Criticism came from both Western and Eastern Europe, North America, Australia and some east Asian and Latin American countries. Notably, many Asian countries remained silent throughout the protests; the government of India responded to the massacre by ordering the state television to pare down the coverage to the barest minimum, so as not to jeopardize a thawing in relations with China, and to offer political empathy for the events. North Korea, Cuba, Czechoslovakia, and East Germany, among others, supported the Chinese government and denounced the protests. Overseas Chinese students demonstrated in many cities in Europe, America, the Middle East, and Asia against the Chinese government.

National reaction 
Some Chinese citizens deplored the incident at Tiananmen Square and believed that the massacre of peaceful protesters had been done with such brutal force to prevent any further protests by citizens. In the immediate aftermath of the Tiananmen Square protests the Chinese Communist Party (CCP) maintained its original condemnation of the student demonstrations (see April 26 Editorial) and characterized the crackdown as necessary to maintain stability. Government sources downplayed the violence against demonstrators on 3 and 4 June, and portrayed the public as supportive of the crackdown. In the days after the protest, the CCP attempted to control access to information on the massacre, confiscating film from foreign journalists. Domestic journalists who had been sympathetic to the student movement were removed from their positions, and several foreign journalists were expelled from China. On June 6, State Council spokesman Yuan Mu held a press conference where he claimed that there had been 300 fatalities during the massacre, with no killings having occurred in Tiananmen Square itself. Yuan Mu portrayed the crackdown as a response to "a counterrevolutionary rebellion in the early hours of the morning of June 3." In August 1989, the Chinese government released its complete, official account of the Tiananmen protests, The Truth About the Beijing Turmoil. The narrative presented in The Truth About the Beijing Turmoil differs significantly from the accounts of student leaders and foreign journalists, many of which are banned in China. On the origins of the protest the book states:

	"This turmoil was not a chance occurrence. It was a political turmoil incited by a very small number of political careerists after a few years of plotting and scheming. It was aimed at subverting the socialist People's Republic."

This contradicts the statements of student leaders, who emphasized the spontaneous nature of their decisions to join the protest and their desire to work within the political system. On the 4 June crackdown and its aftermath The Truth About the Beijing Turmoil recounts:

"The measures adopted by the Chinese government to stop the turmoil and put down the rebellion have not only won the acclaim and support of the Chinese people, but they have also won the understanding and support of the governments and peoples of many other countries. The Chinese government has announced that it will unswervingly carry on the policy of reform and opening to the outside world…"

Due to the ongoing censorship in China, it is difficult to verify the claim that the government crackdown had popular support. In the book The People's Republic of Amnesia: Tiananmen Revisited, Chen Guang, a soldier who participated in the 4 June crackdown, describes the attitudes of citizens following the protests, "The residents suddenly changed to become really nice to the soldiers. I thought about this a lot at the time. It really confused me. Why was it like that? On June 4th, all the residents supported the students. So overnight how did they come to support the soldiers?"

In the weeks after the crackdown, Chinese state news focused largely on the aggression of protesters and their killing of PLA soldiers. Footage of Liu Guogeng, who was beaten to death by protesters before being immolated, and his grieving family was shown repeatedly in government television broadcasts during June 1989. State media showed mourners laying wreaths and flowers at the site where Liu was killed. The families of demonstrators and bystanders who were killed during the protest have in some cases been forbidden from engaging in public mourning.

In the decades since the Tiananmen Square protests the CCP has attempted to prevent any remembrance of the protest movement and the subsequent crackdown. While the government initially tried to justify its suppression of the protest, releasing official statements and creating museum exhibits on the events of 3–5 June, it now denies that such suppression ever occurred. In 2011, an opinion piece, "Tiananmen Square a Myth", was published in China Daily, the CCP's English-language newspaper. The article claims that, "When eventually troops were sent in to clear the [Tiananmen] square, the demonstrations were already ending. But by this time the Western media were there in force, keen to grab any story they could." There is no mention of a counterrevolutionary rebellion, as earlier government accounts refer to. As Louisa Lim notes in her book, The People's Republic of Amnesia: Tiananmen Revisited, many young Chinese know almost nothing of the Tiananmen Square protests. In an informal survey, Lim showed the iconic photo of Tank Man to 100 Chinese university students; only 15 correctly identified it as being an image of Tiananmen Square. Perry Link, a Chinese language and literature scholar, writes, "The story of the massacre is banned from textbooks, the media, and all other public contexts." In 2014, Gu Yimin, a Chinese activist, was sentenced to 18 months in prison for attempting to hold a march on the anniversary of the Tiananmen Square crackdown. After filing a request to hold the march in 2013, he was charged with "inciting subversion of state power." Activist groups such as the Tiananmen Mothers have faced intense government surveillance for their attempts to hold the CCP accountable for the losses of their family members.

Currently, the Chinese government blocks all website based searches in China with any regard to the massacre at Tiananmen Square. However, the period of relative political stability, order and economic growth that resulted after the crackdown from 1990 till 2012 saw steadily rising Chinese standards of living, with over 663 million (according to the World Bank) Chinese citizens lifted out of poverty. Trust and legitimacy of the Chinese government also remained high and increased from 83% in 2007 to 87% in 2010 according to the 2010 Pew Research Center Study. It also found that the Chinese people were satisfied (87%) with their Government and feel that their country is moving in the right direction (74%).

Deng Xiaoping 
In 1992, during Deng Xiaoping's southern tour, Deng credited economic reforms with preventing destabilization of the regime following the Tiananmen Square massacre. Deng stated:

Organizations
 Secretary-General Javier Perez de Cuellar was concerned at the incident, adding that the government should uphold the utmost restraint, but also noted that the UN Charter prohibits interference in member states' internal affairs (especially member states with a Security Council veto).

From 7 August to 1 September 1989 the Sub-Commission on Prevention of Discrimination and Protection of Minorities (a part of the Commission on Human Rights) met in Geneva for its thirty-seventh meeting. This meeting was the first time since the killings in June "that a human rights meeting ha[d] begun discussing the subject." At the meeting resolution 1989/5 was adopted by secret ballot on 31 August 1989. The resolution, also called "Situation in China" states the Committee was concerned about what had occurred in China and the implications the crackdown would have on the future of human rights. The resolution has two points:

 Requests the Secretary-General to transmit to the Commission on Human Rights information provided by the Government of China and by other reliable sources;
 Makes an appeal for clemency, in particular in favour of persons deprived of their liberty as a result of the above-mentioned events.

On 1 December 1989 the permanent representative of People's Republic of China (PRC) to the United Nations Ambassador Li Luye replied to the Sub-Commission's adoption of resolution 1989/5 by stating that it was "a brutal interference in China's internal affairs." Li also stated that the "Spokesman of the Foreign Ministry of the People's Republic of China issued a statement on 2 September 1989, solemnly declaring the firm objection of the Chinese Government to the resolution and deeming it to be illegal and null and void."

At the forty-sixth session of the Commission on Human Rights in January 1990 Li distributed a letter as a document for the meeting. In the letter Li reaffirms the position of the Chinese Government toward the resolution and that "actions to put an end to the turmoil and quell the rebellion were justified and legitimate." He also states that the punishment of "criminals" who have "violated the criminal law" is justified and that a small number of Western nations are using the United Nations to interfere internal affairs, which is a clear and complete violation of the UN Charter and international relations.

The forty-sixth session found the Chinese claim of interference in internal affairs indefensible and that "massive violation" of human rights concerned of the international community. It also stated that China had accepted voluntarily the obligations of upholding the human rights of its citizens. When accepted into the United Nations in 1971, China was "bound by established human rights standards which are part of the customary law or which have been accepted by the international community."

 The European Economic Community condemned the government response and cancelled all high level contacts and loans. They planned a resolution at the UNHCR criticising China's human rights record. The EU maintains an arms embargo against China to this day.

Countries 

 The Prime Minister, Bob Hawke, wept at a memorial service in the Great Hall in Parliament. The Australian government granted Chinese students a four-year asylum to stay in Australia.
 The sister party of the ruling party in East Germany, the SEW, criticized the crackdown. Thus, the SEW deviated officially from the course of the SED for the first time. Following pressure from the SED, however, the SEW office then presented an "oral supplement" at the 13th session of the executive committee, in which the events in VRC were again evaluated in the sense of the SED.
 The government supported the actions of the Chinese government, while opposition leader Aung San Suu Kyi condemned them, saying: "We deplore it. It happened in Burma and we wanted the world to stand by Burma, so we stand by the Chinese students."
 The External Affairs Minister Joe Clark described the incident as "inexcusable" and issued a statement: "We can only express horror and outrage at the senseless violence and tragic loss of life resulting from the indiscriminate and brutal use of force against students and civilians of Peking."  In Vancouver, varying reactions to the military action led to friction in the city's Chinese community.
 The government of Czechoslovakia supported the Chinese government's response, expressing the idea that China would overcome its problems and further develop socialism. In response, the Chinese side "highly valued the understanding shown by the Czechoslovak Communist Party and people" for suppressing the "anti-socialist" riots in Beijing.
 The French Foreign Minister, Roland Dumas, said he was "dismayed by the bloody repression" of "an unarmed crowd of demonstrators."
 The government of the German Democratic Republic approved of the military action. On 8 June the Volkskammer unanimously passed a resolution in support of the Chinese government's use of force. High-ranking politicians from the ruling SED party, including Hans Modrow, Günter Schabowski and Egon Krenz, were in China shortly afterward on a goodwill visit. In contrast, members of the general population, including ordinary SED party members, participated in protests against the actions of the Chinese government.
 The West German Foreign Ministry urged China "to return to its universally welcomed policies of reform and openness."
 The Holy See of Vatican City has no official diplomatic relations with China, but Pope John Paul II expressed hope that the events in China would bring change.
 The military action severely affected perceptions of the mainland. 200,000 people protested against the Chinese government's response, with the latter considering the protests as "subversive". The people of Hong Kong hoped that the chaos on the mainland would destabilize the Beijing Government and thus avert its reunification with the rest of mainland China. The Sino-British Joint Declaration was also called into question. Demonstrations continued for several days, and wreaths were placed outside the Xinhua News Agency office in the city. This further fueled the mass migration wave of Hong Kong people out of Hong Kong.
 The Hungarian government, which was undergoing political reform, reacted strongly to the incident. The Foreign Minister described the events as a "horrible tragedy", and the government expressed "shock", adding that "fundamental human rights could not be exclusively confined to the internal affairs of any country." Demonstrations were held outside the Chinese embassy. Hungary was the only country in Europe to have substantially reduced relations with China in the aftermath of the events.
The government of India responded by ordering the state television to pare down the coverage to the barest minimum. The government's monopoly over television in the 1980s helped Prime Minister Rajiv Gandhi signal to Beijing that India would not revel in China's domestic troubles and offer some political empathy instead. The Communist Party of India (Marxist) was the only political party in the world to pass a resolution hailing the protests, calling them 'an imperialist attempt to internally subvert socialism, [which] was successfully thwarted by the CPC and the PLA.' Sitaram Yechury, now the CPI(M) General Secretary, proclaimed in 1989 at Jawaharlal Nehru University that “Not a drop of blood was shed at Tiananmen Square.”
 The Italian Communist Party leader Achille Occhetto condemned the "unspeakable slaughter in progress in China".
 The Japanese government called the response "intolerable" and froze loans to China. Japan was also the first member of the G7 to restore high level relations with China in the following months.
 Kuwait voiced understanding of the measures taken by the Chinese authorities to protect social stability.
 150,000 protested in Macau.
 Many reformists and activists, including Davaadorjiin Ganbold, Tsakhiagiin Elbegdorj Sanjaasürengiin Zorig, Erdeniin Bat-Üül and Dogmidiin Sosorbaram had been aware of the international reaction to the military action, and chose to follow the democratic changes in Eastern Europe and the Soviet Union.
 The Dutch government froze diplomatic relations with China, and summoned the Chinese Chargé d'Affaires Li Qin Ping expressing shock at the "violent and brutal actions of the People's Liberation Army."
 President Corazon Aquino expressed sadness at the incident, urging the Chinese government to "urgently and immediately take steps to stop the aggressive and senseless killing by its armed forces". Socialist labor organization Kilusang Mayo Uno at first initially supported the action taken by Chinese authorities, though later issued a "rectified position" which blamed "insufficient information and improper decision making process". The Communist Party also expressed opposition due to its line considering China as "Revisionist" after renouncing Maoism and reviving Capitalism.
 The Polish government criticised the response of the Chinese government but not the government itself. A government spokesman called the incident "tragic", with "sincere sympathy for the families of those killed and injured." Daily protests and hunger strikes took place outside the Chinese embassy in Warsaw.  The government also expressed hope that it did not affect Sino-Polish relations. After Solidarity assumed the political leadership of Poland, the new government issued new stamps to commemorate the student protests in Tiananmen Square in China in the Spring of 1989.
 Nicolae Ceauşescu praised the military action, and in a reciprocal move, China sent Qiao Shi to the Romanian Communist Party Congress in August 1989, at which Ceauşescu was re-elected.
 (Taiwan) President Lee Teng-hui issued a statement on 4 June strongly condemning the mainland Chinese response: "Early this morning, Chinese communist troops finally used military force to attack the students and others demonstrating peacefully for democracy and freedom in Tiananmen Square in Peking, resulting in heavy casualties and loss of life. Although we anticipated this mad action of the Chinese communists beforehand, it still has moved us to incomparable grief, indignation and shock." The authorities also lifted a ban on telephone communications to encourage private contacts and counter the news blackout on the mainland.
 Prime Minister Lee Kuan Yew, speaking on behalf of the Cabinet, said they were shocked and saddened by the response of the Chinese government, adding that "we had expected the Chinese government to apply the doctrine of minimum force when an army is used to quell civil disorder."
 General Secretary Mikhail Gorbachev did not explicitly condemn the actions, but called for reform. There was an interest on building relations on a recent summit in Beijing, but the events fueled discussion on human rights and Soviet foreign policy. There was some private criticism of the Chinese response. Newly formed opposition groups condemned the military action. Ten days after the incident the government expressed regret, calling for political dialogue. Public demonstrations occurred at the Chinese embassy in Moscow. A spokesman on 10 June said the Kremlin was "extremely dismayed" at the incident.
 The Foreign Ministry expressed "grave concern" and hoped for no further deterioration of the situation. The statement also encouraged dialogue to resolve the issue peacefully.
 The Swedish government froze diplomatic relations with China.
 The Thai government had the warmest relations with Beijing out of all ASEAN members, and expressed confidence that the "fluid situation" in China had passed its "critical point", though it was concerned that it could delay a settlement in the Cambodian–Vietnamese War.
 The Prime Minister, Margaret Thatcher, expressed "utter revulsion and outrage", and was "appalled by the indiscriminate shooting of unarmed people." She promised to relax immigration laws for Hong Kong residents.

 The United States Congress and media criticized the military action. President George H. W. Bush suspended military sales and visits to that country. Large scale protests against the Chinese government took place around the country. George Washington University revealed that, through high-level secret channels on 30 June 1989, the US government conveyed to the government of the People's Republic of China that the events around the Tiananmen Square protests were an "internal affair". U.S. public opinion of China dropped significantly after the Tiananmen Square protests, from 72% having favorable opinions of China before the Tiananmen Protests to only 34% in August 1989.
 Despite Vietnam and China's history of strained relations, the Vietnamese government quietly supported the Chinese government. Media reported on the protests but offered no commentary, and state radio added that the PLA could not have stopped the action after "hooligans and ruffians insulted or beat up soldiers" and destroyed military vehicles. The government expressed that it wanted better relations with China, but did not want to go to the "extremes of Eastern Europe or Tiananmen" – referring to its own stability.
 The national news agency Tanjug in the non-aligned country said the protest became a "symbol of destroyed illusions and also a symbol of sacrificed ideals which have been cut off by machine gun volleys and squashed under the caterpillars of heavy vehicles."

Reaction of Chinese in North America, Hong Kong and Taiwan

The Chinese Communist Party and the aftermath of the incident
The CCP, under the leadership of Premier Li Peng and Party General Secretary Jiang Zemin, sought to minimize the impact of the Tiananmen Square Massacre on China's international image. They gave multiple "reassuring public speeches" in an attempt to avoid the loss of Most Favoured Nation trade status with the United States as well as to alter the opinion of overseas Chinese. Beijing offered inducements to the overseas Chinese intellectuals that lead the overseas pro-democratic movements, attempting to regain their loyalty.  Many overseas Chinese, however, view the 4 June Incident as yet another example of communist repression in a long string of similar incidents.

Hong Kong
Following the crackdown, rallies supporting Tiananmen Square protesters erupted throughout the world. In the days following the initial crackdown, 200,000 people in Hong Kong formed a massive rally, one of the largest in Hong Kong's history, to mourn the dead and protest the Chinese government's brutality. This protest was also tinged with fear, however, as the spectre of reunification with China hung over their heads. Reunification, even under the "one country, two systems" doctrine sent hundreds of thousands of Hong Kongers scrambling for a chance to immigrate to another country. In the end "thousands of people ... disillusioned and worried about their future, moved overseas". But many Hong Kong denizens continued to protest the crackdown in the PRC, calling for unity with the Chinese people in fighting for democracy.

Following the massacre, Hong Kong's largest ever protest erupted as people protested in support of the student movement. This protest was organized by the newly created Hong Kong Alliance in Support of Patriotic Democratic Movements in China. Over 1.5 million joined the march. Hong Kong's protest was the largest protest against the crackdown outside Beijing.

Taiwan 
While many in Taiwan also protested the CCP's handling of the 4 June crackdown, going so far as to stage a "hands across the island" demonstration, there seemed to be an ambivalence to the events in China. Chou Tien-Jui, publisher of a weekly news magazine called The Journalist commented that "people in Taiwan think that Tiananmen Square is very far away. ... They think that we have plenty of local issues to be concerned about."  Other than the Hands across the island demonstration, there seemed to only be a "muted and controlled local response to the upheaval in China." What demonstrations did happen seemed "more dutiful than enthusiastic". ROC President Lee Teng-hui issued a statement on 4 June commenting that "although [the Taiwanese government] anticipated this mad action of the Chinese communists beforehand, it still has moved us to incomparable grief, indignation and shock".

Canada
5 June 1989 was marked by mass protests against the Beijing government by Chinese Canadians. The Chinese consulate in Toronto was picketed by 30,000 protesters of Chinese descent or their supporters. Members of the protest called for an end to the bloodshed as well as "death to Premier Li Peng". Five Hundred Chinese Canadians rallied in front of the Chinese consulate in Vancouver. In Halifax, one hundred Chinese students protested the actions of the PLA and the resulting violence. Chinese students at the University of Manitoba held their protests in the provincial legislature. Allan Chan, from the University of Calgary, commented that the government action was inevitable because "the students tried to push too hard ... [and that] you can't change a whole society overnight". Yan Xiaoqiao, a PhD chemistry student enrolled in Simon Fraser University, said "today is one of the darkest days in Chinese history". Many of the Chinese foreign exchange students studying in Canada opted to apply for permanent residency in the aftermath of 4 June rather than return to China.

There were international responses toward the Tiananmen Square protests of 1989. In Vancouver, British Columbia, the Chinese community was among those who stood up against the Chinese Communist Party's decision to take military action against student protesters. To demonstrate their support of the students in Tiananmen Square, various Chinese Canadian Organizations protested in Vancouver.

Vancouver's Chinese community protests

Using tactics similar to those used by the university students in Beijing, 1,000 protesters took to Granville Street in Vancouver, British Columbia and marched to the Chinese Consulate. The Vancouver Sun reported that protesters wore black armbands, carried banners with slogans like "Li Peng, you are a beast!" or "Today's menu Deng Xiaoping Stew—Free delivery all over China" and demanded a statement from the consul-general. Members of various Chinese organizations attended the demonstration including vice-president of the Chinese Benevolent Association of Canada, Gim Huey. Huey said that the weekend massacre in Beijing has ended support for state communism in China. Chinese university students from British Columbia also participated in the events. A student from the University of Victoria said, "Tiananmen Square has never been attacked by any government, even the Japanese, Chinese culture has a long civilization that was destroyed by the government".

In the following weeks the demonstrations continued. On 6 June 1989, 5,000 members of the Vancouver Chinese community, also marched down Granville Street in Vancouver to the Chinese Consulate and held a 40-minute candlelight memorial service. Six days later, on 12 June 1989, more members of the Vancouver's Chinese community rallied in Vancouver's Chinatown. A group of 13,000 protesters joined this rally, which was followed by a speech by local political leader, Ed Broadbent of the New Democratic Party. Broadbent called for the immediate withdrawal of the Canadian Ambassador in China and an emergency debate of the crisis by the United Nations Security Council. Afterward, demonstrators took turns expressing their feelings about the Chinese Government's decisions to use military violence on students. A Chinese student from Simon Fraser University stated, "For each of those who have fallen, 1,000 Chinese will come forward and rise up".

Dispute over the Goddess of Democracy in Vancouver
On 22 August 1989, Vancouver's Chinese community, as well as other human rights activists, united at Robson Square to commemorate the 1989 Tiananmen Square Massacre with an art exhibition. The exhibition displayed different media sources such as videos, images, news clippings, and included discussions for a replica of the Beijing students, 'Goddess of Democracy'.

After the exhibition, the community debated on an appropriate space for a replica statue. Members of Vancouver's Society in Support of Democratic Movement believed that a replica of the Goddess of Democracy should be placed in Vancouver's Dr. Sun Yat-Sen Classical Chinese Garden. The garden's namesake is the nationalist leader, considered to be the father of modern China). However, the garden's boards of trustees did not want the statue, because the garden was not a political forum. Others speculate that the trustees did not want the statue because the Chinese Communist Party donated more than $500,000 to the building of the Dr. Sun Yat-Sen Garden. The Goddess of Democracy debate continued on 26 August 1989 and Gim Huey, chairman of Vancouver's Chinese Benevolent Association, pleaded that the statue must be in Dr. Sun Yat-Sen Garden, stating that it was "not political" but was "promoting freedom and democracy". Huey believed that "Dr. Sun Yat-Sen stood for freedom and that's the whole spirit of the Garden". When talks with the Vancouver Parks Board failed, the proposed replica statue had no home. Finally, after much lobbying, the 'Vancouver Society in Support for the Democracy Movement' was optimistic when new talks began with the University of British Columbia. Reportedly, "the society approached UBC through a campus organization of Chinese students and scholars and got a warm welcome". Talks were successful in finding the statue a home, and these plans were followed through as the 'Goddess of Democracy' statue was moved to the grounds of the University of British Columbia.

Split over National Day in Vancouver
China's National Day, celebrated on 1 October, further stirred up feelings over the Tiananmen Square Massacre. National Day celebrates the founding of the People's Republic of China. In Vancouver, the Chinese community was divided on how to celebrate National Day. Two separate events were planned. Supporters for democracy in China proposed a 24-hour fast along with a reenactment of the Beijing students' tent camps. The Chinese Cultural Center and Chinese Benevolent Association proposed that regular National Day events like lion dancing and dinner should take place. Bill Chu from the Canadian Christians for Democratic Movement in China stated that decisions to continue regular National Day celebrations were another Chinese government cover-up and that telephone polls showed that "71.6% of Vancouver's Chinese community opposed celebrations". Tommy Toa, former director of the Chinese Benevolent Association stated, "To celebrate national Day without condemnation of the current Chinese government is hypocritical [...] I believe if we celebrate anything we should celebrate the courage and determination of the Chinese people seeking democracy". In reaction to the pro-democracy stance, the director of the Chinese Cultural Center Dr. K.T Yue said that because Canada still recognized the Chinese government, "we go along with the government", even though he sympathized with the democracy movement.

On 1 October 1989, the National Day events unfolded with two clear stances. A protest of more than 500 pro-Democracy supporters, was held outside the Main Street SkyTrain station in Vancouver, against the Tiananmen Square Massacre. Chan Kwok-Kin criticized those who attended the regular National Day celebrations stating, "I think those who are feasting are doing so for personal gain". Others like the Chinese Benevolent Association's president, Bill Yee, defended their National Day celebration, arguing that it was rooted in a 30-year-old tradition.

Setting a precedent in law – United States 
As veterans of the 4 June movement settled into lives in their adopted countries, some, like Wang Dan, chose to continue the fight against the CCP. He, along with four other protesters, launched a lawsuit against Li Peng for his part in the military crackdown. Their goal was to "prove that he is accountable for the crime, and that this kind of crime, the human rights violation, is beyond China's borders".

References

1989 in international relations
History of Vancouver
1989 Tiananmen Square protests and massacre
Reactions